This list of African American Historic Places in Washington, D.C. is based on a book by the National Park Service, The Preservation Press, the National Trust for Historic Preservation, and the National Conference of State Historic Preservation Officers.

Some of these sites are on the National Register of Historic Places (NR) as independent sites or as part of larger historic district. Several of the sites are National Historic Landmarks (NRL). Others have Washington, D.C. historical markers (HM). The citation on historical markers is given in the reference. The location listed is the nearest community to the site. More precise locations are given in the reference.

Northwest

 Andrew Rankin Memorial Chapel, Frederick Douglass Memorial Hall, Founders Library
 Asbury United Methodist Church
 Banneker Recreation Center
 Brightwood
Military Road School
 Carter G. Woodson House
 Charles Sumner School
 Charlotte Forten Grimké House
 Columbia Heights
 Francis L. Cardozo Senior High School
 Downtown
 Metropolitan African Methodist Episcopal Church
 Dupont Circle
 Anthony Bowen YMCA
 Strivers' Section Historic District
 Foggy Bottom
 St. Mary's Episcopal Church
 Freedman's Hospital
 Georgetown
 Mount Zion Cemetery
 Mount Zion United Methodist Church
 Howard Theatre
 Howard University
 Howard University Hospital
 LeDroit Park
 LeDroit Park Historic District
 Mary Church Terrell House
 Lincoln Theatre
 Margaret Murray Washington School
 Mary McLeod Bethune Council House National Historic Site
 Miner Normal School
 Mount Vernon Square/Convention Center
 Blanche K. Bruce House
 Shaw
 Blagden Alley-Naylor Court Historic District
 Frelinghuysen University, Former Classroom Building
 Lincoln Temple United Church of Christ
 Mary Ann Shadd Cary House
 Prince Hall Masonic Temple
 St. Luke's Episcopal Church
 Shaw Junior High School
 Southern Aid Society-Dunbar Theater Building
 True Reformer Building
 Truxton Circle
 John Fox Slater Elementary School
 John Mercer Langston School
 Margaret Murray Washington School
 U Street Corridor
 Whitelaw Hotel

Northeast

 Brentwood
 Ralph Bunche House
 Brookland
 Sterling Brown House
 Carver Langstron  
 Langston Terrace Dwellings
 Fletcher Chapel
 Langston Golf Course Historic District
 Kingman Park Historic District
 Mayfair
 Mayfair Mansions Apartments
 Nannie Helen Burroughs School
 Young, Browne, Phelps and Spingarn Educational Campus Historic District

Southeast
 Anacostia
 Anacostia Historic District
 Frederick Douglass National Historic Site
 John Philip Sousa Junior High School
 Navy Yard
 Saint Paul African Union Methodist Church

Southwest
 Friendship Baptist Church
 Lincoln Memorial
 William Syphax School

Other locations 
 Camp Greene on Theodore Roosevelt Island
 Evans-Tibbs House
 Gen. Oliver Otis Howard House
 M Street High School
 Phillis Wheatley YMCA
 True Reformer Building

See also
 List of artworks commemorating African Americans in Washington, D.C.
 History of Washington, D.C.
 Timeline of Washington, D.C.

References

African-American history of Washington, D.C.
Washington, D.C.-related lists
District of Columbia
Historic sites in Washington, D.C.